Fredrik André Bjørkan (born 21 August 1998) is a Norwegian professional footballer who plays as a left-back for Eliteserien club Bodø/Glimt. He also represents the Norway national team.

Club career

Bodø/Glimt 
Bjørkan was born in Bodø, Nordland. He started playing for hometown club Bodø/Glimt as a youth, and made his first professional appearance at age 17, on 13 April 2016, in the Norwegian Football Cup, against IF Fløya, which Bodø/Glimt won 6–0. He made his league debut for Bodø/Glimt on 17 April 2016 against Molde where Bodø/Glimt lost 2–1.

Hertha BSC 
On 1 December 2021, Bjørkan signed for Hertha BSC on a contract until 2025, joining at the beginning of the January transfer window. Bjørkan moved back to Bodø/Glimt in January 2023.

Feyenoord (loan) 
On 29 August 2022, Feyenoord announced that it had signed Bjørkan on loan with an option to buy. The loan agreement was disbanded in January 2023.

International career
Bjørkan made his debut for the Norway national team on 6 June 2021 in a friendly against Greece. He substituted Birger Meling in the 69th minute.

Personal life 
Fredrik André is the son of former player Aasmund Bjørkan.

Career statistics

Club

Honours
Bodø/Glimt
Eliteserien: 2020, 2021

References

1998 births
Living people
Sportspeople from Bodø
Norwegian footballers
Association football defenders
Norway youth international footballers
Norway under-21 international footballers
Norway international footballers
Eliteserien players
Norwegian First Division players
Bundesliga players
FK Bodø/Glimt players
Hertha BSC players
Feyenoord players
Norwegian expatriate footballers
Expatriate footballers in Germany
Norwegian expatriate sportspeople in Germany
Expatriate footballers in the Netherlands
Norwegian expatriate sportspeople in the Netherlands